was a district located in Saga Prefecture, Japan.

Former towns
Higashiyoka
Kawasoe
Kubota

Timeline
April 1, 1889 (23 villages)
Due to the city status enforcement, the city of Saga was formed.
Due to the municipal status enforcement, 23 villages were formed within Saga District.
June 6, 1899 - The village of Kose (古瀬村) was renamed as the village of Kose (巨勢村).
October 1, 1922 - The village of Kōno was merged into the city of Saga. (22 villages)
April 1, 1953 - The village of Minamikawasoe was elevated to town status to become the town of Minamikawasoe. (1 town, 21 villages)
March 31, 1954 - The villages of Hyōgo, Kose, Nishiyoka, Kase and Takagise were merged into the city of Saga. (1 town, 16 villages)
October 1, 1954 - The villages of Kitakawasoe, Honjō, Nabeshima, Kinryū and Kuboizumi were merged into the city of Saga. (1 town, 11 villages)
March 1, 1955 - The villages of Higashikawasoe and Shinkita were merged to create the town of Morodomi. (2 towns, 9 villages)
April 1, 1955 - The town of Minamikawasoe, and the villages of Nakakawasoe and Ōdakuma were merged to create the town of Kawasoe. (2 towns, 7 villages)
April 16, 1955 - The villages of Kasuga, Kawakami and Matsuume were merged to create the village of Yamato. (2 towns, 5 villages)
September 30, 1956: (2 towns, 4 villages)
The village of Nishikawasoe was merged into the town of Kawasoe.
The village of Ozeki was merged with the villages of Nanzan and Hokuzan (both from Ogi District) to create the village of Fuji.
June 1, 1958 - Parts of the village of Fuji (the locality of Hattabaru) was merged into the village of Yamato.
January 1, 1959 - The village of Yamato was elevated to town status to become the town of Yamato. (3 towns, 3 villages)
October 1, 1962 - The town of Kubota absorbed parts of the village of Hishikari (from Ogi District).
October 1, 1966: (5 towns, 1 village)
The village of Higashiyoka was elevated to town status to become the town of Higashiyoka.
The village of Fuji was elevated to town status to become the town of Fuji.
April 1, 1967 - The village of Kubota was elevated to town status to become the town of Kubota. (6 towns)
April 1, 1996 - Parts of the town of Yamato (the locality of Matsuse) merged into the town of Fuji.
October 1, 2005 - The towns of Fuji, Morodomi and Yamato, along with the village of Mitsuse (from Kanzaki District) were merged into the expanded city of Saga. (3 towns)
October 1, 2007 - The towns of Higashiyoka, Kawasoe and Kubota were merged into the expanded city of Saga. Saga District was dissolved as a result of this merger.

See also
List of dissolved districts of Japan

Saga District